Schadenfreude is an EP by Australian noise rock band Lubricated Goat, released in May 1989 by Black Eye Records.

Track listing

Personnel
Adapted from the Schadenfreude liner notes.

Lubricated Goat
Guy Maddison – bass guitar
Gene Ravet – drums
Stu Spasm – lead vocals, guitar, production
Charles Tolnay – guitar

Production and additional personnel
Dave Boyne – production
John Foy – cover art

Release history

References

External links 
 

1989 EPs
Lubricated Goat albums